Union Township is a township in Daviess County, in the U.S. state of Missouri.

Union Township was named for the fact a large share of the county residents were pro-Union during the Civil War.

References

Townships in Missouri
Townships in Daviess County, Missouri